Sir John Henry Eugen Vanderstegen Millington-Drake, KCMG (26 February 1889 – 12 December 1972) was a British diplomat.

Origins
Eugen Millington-Drake was the son of Henry Drake (born 1859), who in 1900 changed his name to Henry Millington-Drake, and Ellen Grangor Millington (married 1888). His grandfather was John Vanderstegen Drake, which explains his full name. Eugen was born in Paris, yet a British subject through parentage. He was educated at Eton and Magdalen College, Oxford, where he rowed in the winning 1911 Boat Race crew.

Diplomatic career
In 1912 he had entered the Diplomatic Service and his posts included St. Petersburg (1913); Buenos Aires (1915); at the Paris Peace Delegation and Embassy (1919–1920); First Secretary and Chargé d'Affaires at Bucharest (1921–1924); Brussels (1924–1927); Copenhagen (1927–1928); Counsellor of Embassy, and Buenos Aires (1929–1933).

Service in Uruguay and the Battle of the River Plate

He subsequently became Minister to Uruguay (1934–1941). In 1936 he was the Honorary President of Uruguayan Delegation to the 1936 Summer Olympics. In 1939 he played a pivotal, behind-the scenes role in the Battle of the River Plate. (In the 1956 British war film The Battle of the River Plate he is played by the actor Anthony Bushell, and is portrayed as a well dressed and accomplished diplomat.)

Later roles
He was seconded from the Foreign Office as Chief Representative of the British Council in Spanish America, 1942-1946. In 1948 he was Chairman of the Reception Committee of XIV Olympiad in London. He was Vice-President of the Council of the Royal India, Pakistan and Ceylon Society, visiting the East on cultural missions, 1949-1950. In 1952 and 1953 he undertook lecture tours of Africa, Madagascar, Mauritius and Réunion.

Marriage & issue
In 1920 (registration as John H E V Millington-Drake) he married Lady Effie Mackay (born 1895), a younger daughter of the Scottish banker and shipping magnate James Mackay, 1st Earl of Inchcape, with whom in his later life he lived in Rome. By his wife he had four children:
Jean Ellen Millington-Drake (1922-1960) ("Nellie"), eldest daughter, who married firstly in 1944 Rear-Admiral Richard Arthur Hawkesworth, RN, and having obtained a divorce in 1948 remarried in that year to Ruggero Spano.
Marie Regina Millington-Drake (1924-1973) (Duchess of Carcaci), an adventurous traveller, who whilst living in Cyprus (where she built Villa Fortuna at Ayios Epiktitos, now known as Villa Firtina and used as the Turkish Ambassador’s summer residence) had been the lover of the author Lawrence Durrell and had featured (as "Marie") in his auto-biographical novel Bitter Lemons (1957) and later (as "Martine") in his Sicilian Carousel (1977), largely a tribute to her. She left Cyprus for Sicily and married Gaetano Paternò-Castello, Duke of Carcaci in Sicily, and lived at Naxos, near Taormina, with issue.
James Mackay Millington-Drake (1928-1983), who married Manon Redvers-Bate, with issue;
Edgar Louis Mackay Vanderstegen Millington-Drake (1932-1994), known as "Teddy", youngest child, the artist Teddy Millington-Drake. Died unmarried.

Legacy

The papers of Sir Eugen Millington-Drake are housed at the Churchill Archives Centre, University of Cambridge, UK. The collection comprises letters and papers covering Sir Eugen's career in the Foreign Office and the British Council, mainly in South America, and his subsequent worldwide lecture tours. Along with personal correspondence, there are photographs illustrating the daily life of a diplomat during and just before the Second World War. There is a section relating to the establishment of the Inchcape Memorial Educational Trust. Another section concerns sports, including the Olympic Games of 1936 and of 1948. There are a few files relating to the Admiral Graf Spee. There are also papers concerning Britain's standing in Uruguay immediately before and during the Second World War. The majority of these papers were sent to the Churchill Archives Centre from Rome by his widow, Lady Effie Millington-Drake, in December 1975. The diaries and letter books were sent later. When the papers arrived, they were in disarray and there was a lot of duplication. The material has now been organized into sections which follow the main divisions of Sir Eugen's career and his principal interests.

Land for the Air Forces Memorial at Runnymede, Surrey was donated by Sir Eugen and Lady Effie Millington-Drake in 1949.

See also
 President Alfredo Baldomir#World War Two

References

External links
Churchill Archives Centre, The Papers of Sir Eugen Millington-Drake, MLDK

1889 births
1972 deaths
Ambassadors of the United Kingdom to Uruguay
Knights Commander of the Order of St Michael and St George
People educated at Eton College
Alumni of Magdalen College, Oxford
Uruguay in World War II